Robert Swan (born 26 February 1943 in Winnipeg, Manitoba) is a Canadian former alpine skier who competed in the 1964 Winter Olympics and 1968 Winter Olympics.

As a testament to Robert Swan's commitment to Alpine skiing, during all of his periods of relentless training, and also his periods of Olympic competition, he donated all of his used equipment every year to the local kids of his tiny remote community in the Chelsea, Quebec area, where he and his family lived throughout his teenage years. His contributions of teaching the local children how to use the equipment that he was passing on to them contributed greatly to the aspirations of would-be future Olympic skiers. His generosity as a neighbour and as an athlete was inspirational and widely appreciated.

External links
 sports-reference.com

1943 births
Living people
Canadian male alpine skiers
Olympic alpine skiers of Canada
Alpine skiers at the 1964 Winter Olympics
Alpine skiers at the 1968 Winter Olympics
Sportspeople from Winnipeg
People from Chelsea, Quebec